Events in the year 1705 in Spain.

Incumbents
Monarch: Philip V

Events
March 21 - Battle of Cabrita Point
September 13–17 - Battle of Montjuïc
September 14 – October 19 - Siege of Barcelona

Births

Deaths

 
1700s in Spain